Lesbian, gay, bisexual, and transgender (LGBT) rights in the British Crown dependency of Jersey have evolved significantly since the early 1990s. Same-sex sexual activity was decriminalised in 1990. Since then, LGBT people have been given many more rights equal to that of heterosexuals, such as an equal age of consent (2006), the right to change legal gender for transgender people (2010), the right to enter into civil partnerships (2012), the right to adopt children (2012) and very broad anti-discrimination and legal protections on the basis of "sexual orientation, gender reassignment and intersex status" (2015). Jersey is the only British territory that explicitly includes "intersex status" within anti-discrimination laws. Same-sex marriage has been legal in Jersey since 1 July 2018.

The status of LGBT rights is similar to that of the United Kingdom and the other two Crown dependencies (the Isle of Man and Guernsey). Societal acceptance of homosexuality and same-sex relationships is high. Jersey organised its first public LGBT event in July 2014, when hundreds of participants gathered in Saint Helier to call for the legalisation of same-sex marriage.

Law regarding same-sex sexual activity
Prior to 1990, same-sex sexual activity was a criminal offence. The age of consent was lowered from 21 to 18 in 1995, exactly one year after the United Kingdom lowered the age of consent to 18. The age of consent has been equal at 16 since 2006.

Recognition of same-sex relationships 

Jersey allows same-sex couples to enter into civil partnerships or marriages.

Civil partnerships
On 20 October 2009, the States of Jersey (Parliament) voted in favour of civil partnerships "in principle". The vote was 48 in favour, 1 against and 4 abstaining. Legislation allowing for civil partnerships was approved on 12 July 2011. The bill was signed by Queen Elizabeth II on 14 December 2011 and registered by the royal court on 6 January 2012. The law took effect on 2 April 2012. It also allows same-sex couples to register their civil partnership in churches, if the church in question chooses to do so.

In March 2022, a bill passed the States of Jersey that allows heterosexual couples to enter civil partnerships - not just same-sex couples. It is expected to go into effect from January 1, 2023.

Marriage
The States made an in-principle agreement to legalise same-sex marriage on 22 September 2015, voting 37–4. Legislation to bring the law into effect was introduced in October 2017. Though delayed on several occasions, the same-sex marriage legislation was approved by the States on 1 February 2018, by a vote of 43–1. The bill received royal assent 23 May 2018, and went into effect on 1 July 2018. The first couple married shortly thereafter, on 9 July.

Adoption and parenting
Both joint and stepchild adoption have been legal since 2012, when the civil partnership law came into effect.

Additionally, lesbian couples can access artificial insemination.

On 23 June 2015, the States of Jersey agreed to bring about changes in their adoption laws, called the Adoption (Amendment No. 7) (Jersey) Law 2015, to grant unmarried couples full adoption rights. Previously, only married couples and couples in civil partnerships were allowed to apply to adopt children. The law came into effect on 16 October 2015.

Discrimination protections
On 2 June 2015, Jersey passed the Discrimination (Sex and Related Characteristics) (Jersey) Regulations 2015, protecting LGBT and intersex people from discrimination. The legislation was approved on third reading by 37 members voting in favour, 1 abstention and 11 absences, and went into effect on 1 September 2015.

Gender identity and expression

Transgender people are allowed to change their legal gender and to have their new gender recognised as a result of the Gender Recognition (Jersey) Law 2010.

Additionally, transgender people are fully protected through anti-discrimination laws.

Blood donation
Gay and bisexual men have been allowed to donate blood, provided they haven't had sex in a year, since 2011. In March 2019, it was confirmed that the 12 month criterion is under review, following the introduction of more advanced blood testing technology. In December 2019, it was revealed that this review would not take place until 2021 at the earliest.

In June 2021, it is proposed that the Channel Islands will be implementing the "UK-model on risk based assessments" of blood donation. It is not clear on when the policy goes into effect yet.

Local charities working for LGBT rights
Liberate is the only organisation in the Channel Islands that represents the local LGBT community and other minority groups. It was established in Guernsey in February 2014 and in Jersey in August 2014. The Jersey branch lobbied to ensure that intersex people were included in Jersey's Discrimination (Sex and Related Characteristics) (Jersey) Regulations 2015 and campaigning to legalise same-sex marriage.

Summary table

See also
	 
Politics of Jersey	
LGBT rights in Guernsey
LGBT rights in the United Kingdom	
LGBT rights in Europe	
Age of consent in Europe

References